The 2018 Hungarian Swimming Championships were the 120th edition of the Hungarian Swimming National Championships (which took place on 28–31 March 2018 at the Debrecen Swimming Pool Complex in Debrecen.

Events
Similar to the program's format, swimming features a total of 42 events (20 each for men and women), including two 2 mixed events. The following events will be contested (all pool events are long course, and distances are in metres unless stated):
Freestyle: 50, 100, 200, 400, 800 (women), and 1,500 (men);
Backstroke: 50, 100 and 200;
Breaststroke: 50, 100 and 200;
Butterfly: 50, 100 and 200;
Individual medley: 200 and 400;
Relays: 4×100 free, 4×200 free; 4×100 medley
Mixed: 4×100 free; 4×100 medley

Schedule

Medal table

Results

Men's events

Women's events

Mixed events

See also
Hungarian Swimming Championships
Hungarian Swimming Association

References

External links
Official website of the Hungarian Swimming Association

Hungarian Swimming Championships
Swimming Championships
Hungarian Swimming Championships